Inga golfodulcensis is a species of plant in the family Fabaceae. It is found in Costa Rica and possibly Colombia.

References

golfodulcensis
Flora of Costa Rica
Endangered plants
Taxonomy articles created by Polbot